Vangueria bicolor is a species of flowering plant in the family Rubiaceae. It is endemic to Tanzania.

References

External links
World Checklist of Rubiaceae

Endemic flora of Tanzania
bicolor
Vulnerable plants
Taxonomy articles created by Polbot